The Republic of Afghanistan was the first republic in Afghanistan. It is often called the Daoud Republic, as it was established in July 1973 after General Sardar Mohammad Daoud Khan deposed his cousin, King Mohammad Zahir Shah, in a coup d'état. General Daoud was known for his autocracy and attempts to modernize the country with help from both the Soviet Union and the United States, among others.

In 1978, a military coup known as the Saur Revolution took place, instigated by the communist People's Democratic Party of Afghanistan, in which Daoud and his family were killed. The "Daoud Republic" was subsequently succeeded by the Soviet-backed Democratic Republic of Afghanistan.

History

Formation 

In July 1973, while King Mohammad Zahir Shah, the reigning Afghan monarch at the time, was in Italy undergoing eye surgery as well as therapy for lumbago, his cousin and brother-in-law, General Sardar Mohammad Daoud Khan, the former Prime Minister, staged a coup d'état in Kabul. This coup overthrew the Kingdom of Afghanistan and established the Republic of Afghanistan in its place, which was a single-party state. General Daoud had been forced to resign as Prime Minister by King Zahir a decade earlier. The King abdicated the following month rather than risk an all-out civil war.

Single party rule 
After seizing power, Daoud Khan, who had himself proclaimed as the first President of Afghanistan, established his own political party, the National Revolutionary Party. This party became the sole focus of political activity in the country. In January 1977, a loya jirga was convened following the Constitutional Assembly election, and approved a new constitution establishing a presidential one-party state, with political opposition being suppressed, sometimes violently.

Also in 1973, Mohammad Hashim Maiwandwal, a former Prime Minister, was accused of plotting a coup, though it is unclear if the plan was actually targeting the new republican government or the abolished monarchy. Maiwandwal was arrested and allegedly committed suicide in jail before his trial, but widespread belief says he was tortured to death.

Rise of communism 

After General Daoud's 1973 establishment of the Republic of Afghanistan, members of the People's Democratic Party (PDPA) were given positions in the government. In 1976, President Daoud established a seven-year economic plan for the country. He started military training programs with India and commenced economic development talks with Iran. Daoud also turned his attention to oil rich Middle Eastern nations such as Saudi Arabia, Iraq, and Kuwait among others for financial assistance.

But during Daoud's presidency, relations with the Soviet Union deteriorated. They saw his shift to a more Western-friendly leadership as dangerous, including Daoud's criticism of Cuba's membership in the Non-Aligned Movement and Daoud's expulsion of Soviet military and economic advisers. The suppression of political opposition furthermore turned the Soviet-backed PDPA, an important ally in the 1973 coup against the King, against him.

Daoud in 1978 had achieved little of what he had set out to accomplish. The Afghan economy had not made any real progress and the Afghan standard of living had not risen. Daoud had also garnered much criticism for his single party constitution in 1977 which alienated him from his political supporters.

When Afghans by 1978 had grown disappointed with the "do nothing" Daoud government, the PDPA government officials alone were identified by some with economic and social reform. By this time, the two main factions of the PDPA, previously locked in a power struggle, had reached a fragile agreement for reconciliation. Communist-sympathizing army officials were by then already planning a move against the government. According to Hafizullah Amin, who became Afghan head of state in 1979, the PDPA had started plotting the coup in 1976, two years before it materialized.

Saur Revolution 

The PDPA seized power in a brutal military coup in 1978, which is best known as the Saur Revolution. On April 27, troops from the military base at Kabul International Airport started to move towards the center of the capital. It took only 24 hours to consolidate power, with the rapid push including an air raid on the Arg (the Presidential palace), and insurgent army units quickly seized critical institutions and communication lines. The deposed Daoud and most of his family were executed the following day.

Nur Muhammad Taraki, General Secretary of the PDPA, was proclaimed Chairman of the Presidium of the Revolutionary Council and effectively succeeded Mohammed Daoud Khan as head of state. He simultaneously became head of government of the newly established Democratic Republic of Afghanistan.

Politics 
Daoud Khan pursued the policy of bi-tarafi, meaning "without sides", during the Cold War. He sought investments from the Soviet Union and the United States.

Education 
Daoud Khan heavily focused on education and women's rights during his reign. His government opened many schools and by the time of the Saur Revolution, 1 million Afghan students were enrolled in school, many whom were girls.

References

External links 
 Daoud's Republic of Afghanistan

Republic of Afghanistan
Republic of Afghanistan
Republic of Afghanistan
Republic of Afghanistan
Republic of Afghanistan
Afghanistan, Republic of
Afghanistan, Republic of
Former republics
Republic of Afghanistan
Republic of Afghanistan
Republic of Afghanistan
Republic of Afghanistan
Republic of Afghanistan
Republic of Afghanistan